The 2001 Moscow Victory Parade was a celebration of the 56th anniversary of the defeat of Nazi Germany in the Great Patriotic War. The commander of the parade was the acting head of the Moscow Garrison Colonel General Nikolai Makarov. Reviewing the parade was Minister of Defence Sergei Ivanov. 

Music was performed by the Moscow Garrison's Central Orchestra under Lieutenant General Viktor Afanasyev. 

This was the first parade that was inspected by a civilian defense minister.

This parade is also the first time the Soviet-styled State Anthem of the Russian Federation was played since the anthem's last military parade performance in 1990.

Parade formations 
The car carrying the commander of the parade Colonel General Nikolai Makarov 
 Corps of Drums of the Moscow Military Music College
 154th Preobrazhensky Independent Commandant's Regiment
 Historical Units
 Military Academies
 Troops of the Ministry of Internal Affairs

Gallery

References 

Moscow Victory Day Parades
2001 in Moscow
2001 in Russia
May 2001 events in Russia